Ufuk Beydemir (born 14 April 1992) is a Turkish singer, songwriter and tennis coach. He became known in Turkey with the release of his song "Ay Tenli Kadın". In 2018, Beydemir ranked third on the list of nominees for "Musician of the Year Award" at the GQ Men of the Year awards by GQ Türkiye. Beydemir, who released his first album Sevda Gibi in 2018, was given the "Most Powerful Newcomer-Singer" award at the 2019 PowerTürk Music Awards.

Discography
Albums
 Sevda Gibi (2018)
 Kristal Oda (2020)

EPs
 Akustik (2019)

Singles
 "HİÇ" (2021)
 "HİÇ (Can VS Remix)" (2021)
 "Biri Var" (2021)
 "Tamirci Çırağı" (2021)
 "Ellerin Uzansa" (2021)
 "Aklımda Bir Dünya" (2022)
 "Ben Bir Kek Miyim?" (2022)
 "Derdini Bana Anlat" (2022)
 "Galiba (Jeremy Version)" (2022)
 "Ta-Da (Jeremy Version)" (2022)

Awards and nominations
2019 – PowerTürk Music Awards – "Most Powerful Newcomer-Singer"

References

External links
Bazen gürültülü bazen sakin: Ufuk Beydemir – Interview with Esquire
"Ufuk Beydemir: Rock'ta da savaş var (Bizim Rock’çılar)" – Ufuk Beydemir on NTV Radyo. (ntv.com.tr)

1992 births
Turkish male singers
Turkish pop singers
Turkish rock singers
Turkish singer-songwriters
Singers from Istanbul
Living people